"Mommie Beerest" is the seventh episode of the sixteenth season of the American animated television series The Simpsons. It first aired on the Fox network in the United States on January 30, 2005. The episode was directed by Mark Kirland and written by Michael Price.

Plot
The Simpsons celebrate brunch at a fancy restaurant to celebrate Homer finally paying off the mortgage. After Bart and Lisa get in a food fight, Homer goes to Moe's, where the health inspector has come for his regular visit. Since the inspector is a friend of Moe's, he gives the bar a clean bill of health, regardless of numerous violations, but he dies upon consuming one of the expired pickled eggs. The new inspector immediately declares Moe's Tavern to be closed down until the violations are cleared up and the weekly garbage pickup disposes of his predecessor's corpse.

Later, while the regulars hold an Irish wake on the sidewalk, Homer is guilty about Moe's Tavern being closed down because of him, but decides to help Moe reopen the bar by getting a new mortgage for his home, forging with Marge, who becomes the new co-owner. Homer visits a cleaned-up Moe's with Marge running it to protect their investment, and she suggests Homer just concentrate on the kids. Marge also suggests that Moe's should become an English pub and to rename it The Nag & Weasel to improve its image. The Nag & Weasel is a success, and Bart and Lisa observe that Marge now spends more time at the establishment than Homer has ever done. Homer is worried, but Marge has no problem with it.

Homer and Marge go to a movie together, only to be joined by Moe, and Homer learns from Lenny and Carl that Marge and Moe are having what is called an "emotional affair". Homer is also scared when Marge reminds him for the 11th time they are planning to attend a bartender convention in Aruba. Homer, after distracting Bart, Lisa, and Maggie by telling them to travel to Paris in a hot-air balloon so he could save his marriage, rushes to the airport, escorted by Chief Wiggum, and gets to the plane as it is about to become airborne. Meanwhile, Moe finally gets out his true feelings for his partner that he has hidden in the dark for so long, spurred on by the alarming display he witnesses from the window seat.  He tells Marge he loves her, and in a rush, asks her to marry him. Marge is shocked, but before she can answer, a soaking-wet Homer bursts out of the toilet seat in the bathroom and glares at Moe to leave his wife alone. Moe shouts back that Homer does not deserve Marge at all since he knows nothing about her: her favorite dish, for example. Homer does admit that he does not know much about his own wife, but despite his faults, Marge reassures him that he really is her true love, not the bartender.

The three arrive in Aruba, where the miserable Moe attempts to drown himself because of his loss, only to be stopped by Marge and Homer.  Marge explains to him that he is sweet enough a man to be loved by someone else, if only he is willing to make a few, minor changes.  Moe seems to listen, but nevertheless reverts to his original scheme of sharing a hotel room with Marge (he has changed the booking on the sly). Marge instead forces Moe to share the bed with Homer while she settles down on the couch.

Dedication
This episode was dedicated to Johnny Carson, who died a week before this episode aired. Carson also guest-starred as himself on the season-four finale "Krusty Gets Kancelled".

Reception and awards
The episode won writer Michael Price the 2006 Writers' Guild of America Award for writing in animation, marking the third year in a row that an episode of The Simpsons won the award.

References

External links 
 

The Simpsons (season 16) episodes
2005 American television episodes